Irauçuba is a municipality in the state of Ceará in the Northeast region of Brazil.

According to the resident population estimate made by the Brazilian Institute of Geography and Statistics IBGE in 2020, its population was 24,305 inhabitants.

Geography 

The climate is tropical. Summer has much less rainfall than the winter. The climate classification is according to Köppen and Geiger.  The average temperature is 26.3 °C in Irauçuba. Average annual rainfall of 629 semi-arid hot mm. Tropical with average rainfall of 539 mm, with rainfall concentrated 12 January to April 13. Irauçuba has one of medium pluviometrias smaller state. The city is beating too desertification key Irauçuba already have been quite committed to desertification.

Notable people 

The city received international attention after Marcelo Lotif, native from Irauçuba, became the first person from that region to complete higher education and travel abroad. However, in present years, after almost a decade living in North America, Marcelo has been criticized by local population, as it is believed he no longer relates to the average citizen of Irauçuba and its simple way of life.

See also
List of municipalities in Ceará

References

Municipalities in Ceará